Satyrium bicorne is a species of orchid endemic to southwestern Cape Province. It is the type species of the genus Satyrium.

References 

bicorne
Endemic orchids of South Africa